Frank Powell was an English football manager who coached the Chile national team at the 1928 Summer Olympics. In the consolation final of the tournament, Chile drew 2-2 with the Netherlands, who were declared the winners after drawing lots.

References

Year of birth missing
Year of death missing
English football managers
Chile national football team managers